The 37th Helicopter Squadron is a United States Air Force unit assigned to the 582d Helicopter Group in support of the 90th Missile Wing located at Francis E. Warren Air Force Base, Wyoming. The unit is tasked with flight operations in support of the operation and security of F.E. Warren's intercontinental ballistic missile complex as well as search and rescue missions. The unit operates the UH-1N Huey helicopter.

History
Performed search, rescue, and recovery missions in the Far East and in Southeast Asia in the conflicts in Vietnam. Since reactivation in 1973, unit performs nuclear convoy security and missile site support at Francis E. Warren AFB. The unit also flies numerous search & rescue missions and casualty evacuation sorties.

37th Aerospace Rescue and Recovery Squadron

On 8 January 1966, the 37th ARRS was activated at Da Nang Air Base operating 5 HU-16s on loan from the 31st ARRS and the 33rd ARRS and with a detachment at Udorn Royal Thai Air Force Base. The squadron was responsible for aircrew recovery over North Vietnam, Laos and the Gulf of Tonkin.

On 30 March 1966, 2 HC-130s were delivered to Detachment 1 at Udorn RTAFB. A further 3 HC-130s were delivered to Udorn in June 1966.

On 16 January 1967, the squadron's HC-130s at Udorn RTAFB were transferred to the newly formed 39th ARRS. Also on 16 January Detachment 2, 37th ARRS was re-designated from Det. 5, 38th ARRS at Udorn RTAFB operating HH-3s.

On 2 February 1967, all 5 HU-16s assigned to the 37th ARRS were transferred to the 33rd ARRS at Naha, Okinawa.

September 1967, Detachment 2 at Udorn RTAFB received its first 2 HH-53Bs.

May 1967, Detachment 1 38th ARRS operating HH-3s at Danang Air Base was reassigned to the 37th ARRS.

March 1968, Detachment 2 at Udorn RTAFB was transferred to the 40th ARRS.

The 37th ARRS remained at Danang until it was inactivated on 30 November 1972. 5 of its HH-53s were transferred to the 40th ARRS at Nakhon Phanom Royal Thai Air Force Base, while its two HH-43s remained at Danang as Detachment 7 of the 40th ARRS to provide base rescue during Operation Linebacker II.

Operations and losses
18 October 1966, Crown Bravo, HU-16B Tail No 51-7145 was on a search and rescue (SAR) orbit north of the DMZ when it radioed a Navy ship that it was returning to Danang. This was the last contact with the aircraft and no trace of the plane or 7-man crew was ever found.
16 February 1967, Jolly Green 56 took off to rescue the pilot of Dusty 71 an F-100 shot down over Laos. The helicopter received ground fire and the pilot Captain Angelo Pullara, was hit and killed. The helicopter returned safely to Saravane, Laos. The Dusty 71 pilot was rescued by Jolly Green 37.
5 May 1967, 6 civilian men and a 6-year-old boy were rescued by an amphibious aircraft piloted by Colonel Alan R. Vette, the squadron's commanding officer.
27 October 1967, Jolly Green 20, HH-3E Tail No 66-13283 was on a combat search and rescue (CSAR) mission over Laos when it was hit in the engine by ground fire while hovering. Aircraft was destroyed by bombing. Survivors and ground party rescued by Jolly Green 07.
9 November 1967, Jolly Green 26, HH-3E Tail No 66-13279 and Jolly Green 29 were scrambled to extract the five surviving members of a Special Forces reconnaissance team that had suffered heavy casualties in Laos. JG29 successfully extracted 3 indigenous team members before being hit by ground fire, it departed and made an emergency landing at Khe Sanh Combat Base. JG26 extracted Special Forces Specialist Four Joseph G. Kusick and Master Sergeant Bruce R. Baxter, both wounded, but JG26 was then hit by ground fire, crashed and burst into flames. A recovery team was inserted into the area and reached the crash site, but due to fading light, it was impossible to inspect the wreckage at that time. On the morning of 10 November, the pilot Captain Gerald O. Young was rescued after evading capture for some 17 hours after the crash. Later that morning the wreckage was searched and the charred remains of Kusick were recovered. The copilot Captain Ralph Brower, the flight engineer Staff Sergeant Eugene L Clay, the pararescueman Sergeant Larry W. Maysey and Master Sergeant Bruce Baxter were all killed in action-body not recovered. Captain Gerald Young was awarded the Medal of Honor.
28 February 1968, The ARRS made their 1,000 combat save since 1964 when Jolly Green 36 rescued Captain Gene I. Basel, 354th Tactical Fight Squadron pilot flying an Republic F-105D, Bu No 62-4385. When ejection handles failed to engage, the pilot was catapulted to the ground when his aircraft exploded. Pararescue Specialist Joseph M. Duffy went down on the hoist to extract pilot who had sustained two broken thigh bones. At the time of the rescue the Basel's parachute was entangled in branches and there was ground fire approaching his location. The rescue was accomplished in two hours.
9 June 1968, Jolly Green 23 HH-3E Tail No 67-14710 was on CSAR for First Lieutenant Walter R. Schmidt pilot of Hellborne 215, a USMC A-4C shot down over the A Shau Valley. Voice contact was established with Schmidt, who reported he possibly had a broken arm and leg. Several attempts at pickup were made by the lead helicopter, Jolly Green 22, but it was driven off by intense ground fire. After suppressive fire was put in, JG23 moved in to attempt the pickup, JG23 reported taking hits and then caught fire. The pilot attempted to land in a small clearing, but the helicopter exploded when it hit the ground and burned intensely. There were no indications anyone survived the crash. Pilot Lieutenant Jack Columbus Rittichier, co-pilot Captain Richard C. Yeend, flight engineer Staff Sergeant Elmer L. Holden and pararescueman James D. Locker were all killed in action-body not recovered. The remains of the crew were returned and identified in September 2003. First Lieutenant Schmidt remains missing in action presumed dead.
5 October 1968, Jolly Green 10, HH-3E Tail No 65-12782 and another Jolly Green were scrambled to extract a Special Forces reconnaissance team callsign Carrot Top in Laos. The first JG went in under heavy ground fire, received damage to its fuel lines and had to abort the mission and return to the base. JG10 was shot down about 500 m from the pickup point. The pararescueman was able to pull the pilot from the burning helicopter, but before he could return JG10 exploded, killing the copilot Albert D. Wester and the flight engineer Gregory P. Lawrence, who were trapped inside. Another Jolly Green was sent out to rescue the Special Forces team and the 2 survivors from JG10.
24 October 1969, Jolly Green 28 HH-3E tail No 66-13281 dropped pararescueman Technical Sergeant Donald G Smith to rescue the pilot of F-100 Misty 11A over Laos. As Smith and the pilot were being raised, hostile fire rendered the hoist inoperative and the cable was sheared, dropping them fifteen feet to the ground. Smith's position was surrounded by hostile forces and JG28 was downed by hostile fire. Smith controlled and directed the aircraft providing suppressive fire, resulting in the safe recovery of all downed personnel, and he was awarded the Air Force Cross for his actions
15 April 1970, Jolly Green 27, HH-3E Tail No 66-13280 and another Jolly Green were scrambled to rescue the survivors of a downed UH-1 near Dak Seang Camp, Kontum Province, Vietnam. JG27 made three rescue attempts, but was brought down by ground fire. The pilot Captain Travis H Scott was killed on impact. The copilot, Major Wofford, dragged the other two crewmen from the burning aircraft. The second HH-3 evacuated the survivors of the first HH-3 but was unable to rescue personnel in the downed UH-1. The flight engineer Technical Sergeant Gerald L. Hartzel and pararescueman Staff Sergeant Luther E Davis later died from their injuries. Major Wofford was awarded the Air Force Cross, and Captain Scott was posthumously awarded the Air Force Cross.
21 November 1970, Banana 01, HH-3E Tail No 68-12785 was deliberately crashed in the Son Tay POW Camp as part of Operation Ivory Coast.
25 November 1971, Jolly Green 70, HH-53C Tail No 68-10366 crashed into the Song Na River, Gia Dinh, South Vietnam while on a CSAR mission. All 4 crewmen were killed.
3 April 1972, Jolly Greens of the squadron made two attempts to pick up Lieutenant Colonel Iceal Hambleton Bat 21 Bravo near Quảng Trị, South Vietnam, both times, they were driven off with heavy damage to their aircraft. On 6 April Jolly Green 67 HH-53C Tail No 68-10365 was designated to make the rescue attempt, but as it came to a hover over Hambleton, it was raked by heavy fire. JG67 aborted the rescue attempt and tried to maneuver to safety, but the enemy fire continued and JG67 crashed in a huge fireball a few km south of the pickup point. The fire was intense and lasted several days. All 6 crewmembers were killed. The remains of the crew were returned in June 1994 and were buried as a group at Arlington National Cemetery in November 1997.
1 May 1972, Jolly Greens of the squadron evacuated 132 US advisers from Quảng Trị as the city was falling to the PAVN Easter Offensive
18 August 1972, HH-53C Tail No 68-10361 was destroyed on the ramp at Danang by a Vietcong 122mm rocket.

Lineage
 Constituted as the 37th Air Rescue Squadron on 17 October 1952
 Activated on 14 November 1952
 Inactivated on 8 May 1955
 Redesignated 37th Aerospace Rescue and Recovery Squadron and activated on 14 December 1965 (not organized)
 Organized on 8 January 1966
 Inactivated on 29 December 1972
 Activated on 1 October 1973
 Redesignated 37th Air Rescue Squadron on 1 June 1989
 Redesignated 37th Rescue Squadron on 1 February 1993
 Redesignated 37th Rescue Flight on 1 May 1993
 Redesignated 37th Helicopter Flight on 1 May 1998
 Redesignated 37th Helicopter Squadron on 21 October 2005

Assignments
 3d Air Rescue Group: 14 November 1952 – 8 May 1955
 Military Air Transport Service: 14 December 1965 (not organized)
 Military Airlift Command: 1 January 1966 (not organized)
 3d Aerospace Rescue and Recovery Group: 8 January 1966
 41st Aerospace Rescue and Recovery Wing: 20 August 1972 – 29 December 1972 (remained under operational control of 3rd Aerospace Rescue and Recovery Group)
 Aerospace Rescue and Recovery Service: 1 October 1973
 39th Aerospace Rescue and Recovery Wing: 1 July 1978
 41st Rescue and Weather Reconnaissance Wing: 1 February 1987
 Air Rescue Service: 1 August 1989
 90th Operations Group: 1 February 1993 (attached to 20th AF Helicopter Operations Group (Provisional) after 1 August 2014)
 582d Helicopter Group, 15 January 2015 – present

Stations
 Komaki Air Base, Japan, 14 November 1952
 Yokota Air Base, Japan, 23 July 1954 – 8 May 1955
 Da Nang Air Base, South Vietnam, 8 January 1966 – 29 December 1972
 Udorn Royal Thai Air Force Base, Thailand (1966–1968)
 Nakhon Phanom Royal Thai Air Force Base, Thailand
 Francis E. Warren Air Force Base, Wyoming, 1 October 1973 – present

Aircraft

 Boeing SB-29 Superfortress (1952–1955)
 Douglas SC-47 Skytrain (1952–1954)
 Lockheed HC-130 Hercules (1966-1967)
 Grumman HU-16 Albatross (1966–1967)
 Sikorsky HH-3 Jolly Green Giant (1967–1970)
 Sikorsky HH-53 Super Jolly Green Giant (1970–1972)
 Kaman HH-43 Huskie (1971–1972)
 Bell UH-1 Iroquois (1973–present)
 Bell HH-1 Iroquois (1974–1993)
 Bell TH-1 Iroquois (1974–1987)

See also
 List of Douglas C-47 Skytrain operators
 List of Lockheed C-130 Hercules operators
 List of United States Air Force helicopter squadrons
 List of United States Air Force rescue squadrons

References

Notes

Bibliography

 
 

Military units and formations in Wyoming
Helicopter squadrons of the United States Air Force
Military units and formations established in 1952